A list of films produced by the Tollywood (Bengali language film industry) based in Kolkata in the year of 2008.

Highest-grossing

Top ten movies

Chirodini Tumi Je Amar
Bhalobasa Bhalobasa
Gharjamai
Shibaji
Premer Kahini
Mon Mane Na
Golmaal
Chalo Let's Go
10:10
Bajimaat

A-Z of films

References

External links
 Tollywood films of 2008 at the Internet Movie Database

2008
Lists of 2008 films by country or language
2008 in Indian cinema